Bıyıklı Mehmed Pasha (Ottoman Turkish: بیقلی مهمد پاثا, died 24 December 1521) known as Fatih Pasha, was an Ottoman serdar and governor of Diyarbakır of Turkish origin. descended from the Aq Qoyunlu.

Military career 
After the Battle of Chaldiran (1514), he commanded the East Front against Safavids from 1515 to 1521. In this campaign, he captured the Diyarbakır, Mardin, Raqqa, Mosul and other important cities of the Southeastern Anatolia and Northern Iraq regions. He defeated the Safavid army twice in the Battle of Tekiryaylağı (1515) and the Battle of Koçhisar (1516). He commanded the Ottoman left flank at the Battle of Marj Dabiq against the Mamluk army. After this battle, he turned to the eastern front to continue his campaign. During his campaign, he became a Vizier Governor of Diyarbakır after the siege and capture of Diyarbakır. He commanded this front until his death in 1521.

Sources 

 Mehdi, İ. (2015). Amid (Diyarbakır). Ankara: Türk Tarih Kurumu. 
Mehdi, İ. (1981). Diyarbakır Fatihi ve Beylerbeyi Bıyıklı Mehmed Paşa.
 Hoca Sadeddin Efendi. (1585). Tâcü’t-Tevârîh - IV. İstanbul 
 Göyünç, N. (1969). XVI’ncı Yüzyılda Mardin Sancağı. İstanbul: İstanbul Üniversitesi Edebiyat Fakültesi. 
https://islamansiklopedisi.org.tr/biyikli-mehmed-pasa

References 

Year of birth missing
1521 deaths
Pashas
Ottoman people of the Ottoman–Persian Wars
Turks from the Ottoman Empire